The Kameng Elephant Reserve is an Elephant Reserve located in the Himalayan foothills of Arunachal Pradesh, India, in the districts of West Kameng and East Kameng.

Geography
It is bordered by Nameri National Park and the Sonai Rupai Wildlife Sanctuary. It includes the Sessa Orchid Sanctuary, Eaglenest Wildlife Sanctuary, Pakke Tiger Reserve, and the Amortala, Doimara and Papum reserved forests. The reserve's rugged terrain consists of mountains, hills, valleys, and narrow plains, with numerous streams.

Climate 
The Kameng Elephant Reserve has four seasons: winter from December–February, pre-monsoon from March–May, monsoon from June–September, and post-monsoon from October to November.  of rainfall occurs throughout the year, with June and July being the wettest months. The lower regions of the reserve have high summer and moderate winter temperatures, but areas at high elevations face temperatures below  during the winter, with heavy snowfall from December to February. Humidity in the reserve varies from 40% to 85%.

Ecology

Fauna 
The Kameng Elephant Reserve is highly biodiverse, with 120 species of mammals, 35 species of reptiles, 29 species of amphibians, and 40 species of fish having been recorded from the Pakke Tiger Reserve within it. Major mammals from the reserve include Asian elephants, tigers, leopards, clouded leopards, gaur, Asian black bears, red panda, and snow leopards. A 2003 survey of Eaglenest Wildlife Sanctuary, Sessa Orchid Sanctuary, and parts of the Doimara reserved forest found 353 species of birds, including three threatened species and five near-threatened species. 463 species of butterflies have been recorded in the Kameng Elephant Reserve. The Bugun liocichla and the frog Leptobrachium bompu are both known only from the Eaglenest Wildlife Sanctuary within the reserve.

A 2001 census estimated the elephant population in the park to be 470. A 2008 study estimated the population to be 450–612 based on the density of dung piles within the reserve.

Flora 
The Kameng Elephant Reserve's vegetation consists of evergreen forest, semi-evergreen forest, grassland, coniferous forest, and alpine forest. A 2008 study that sampled an area of  found 47 species of plants belonging to 27 families.

Notes

Elephant reserves of India
Wildlife sanctuaries in Arunachal Pradesh
West Kameng district
East Kameng district
2002 establishments in Arunachal Pradesh
Protected areas established in 2002